Vinary may refer to places in the Czech Republic:

Vinary (Hradec Králové District), a municipality and village in the Hradec Králové Region
Vinary (Přerov), a village and administrative part of Přerov in the Olomouc Region
Vinary (Ústí nad Orlicí District), a municipality and village in the Pardubice Region